Danja Müsch (born April 14, 1971 in Kassel) is a former female beach volleyball player from Germany, who represented her native country in three consecutive Summer Olympics: 1996, 2000 and 2004. Partnering Beate Bühler she claimed the gold medal at the 1994 European Championships in Almería, Spain.

Müsch currently works for German TV station Sport1, reporting on volleyball and handball.

Playing partners
 Beate Bühler
 Maike Friedrichsen
 Susanne Lahme
 Jana Vollmer

References

External links
 
 
 

1971 births
Living people
German women's beach volleyball players
Beach volleyball players at the 1996 Summer Olympics
Beach volleyball players at the 2000 Summer Olympics
Beach volleyball players at the 2004 Summer Olympics
Olympic beach volleyball players of Germany
Sportspeople from Kassel